Jack D. Schwager (born 1948) is an American trader and author. His books include Market Wizards (1989), The New Market Wizards (1992), Stock Market Wizards (2001) and Unknown Market Wizards: The best traders you've never heard of (2020).

References

External links
 Video interview with Opalesque TV
 Podcast interview with IG Group

1948 births
Living people
American finance and investment writers